Your Friend and Mine is a 1923 American silent drama film directed by Clarence G. Badger and starring Enid Bennett, Huntley Gordon, and Willard Mack. It is based upon the play of the same name by Mack.

Cast

Preservation
With no prints of Your Friend and Mine located in any film archives, it is a lost film.

References

Bibliography
 Goble, Alan. The Complete Index to Literary Sources in Film. Walter de Gruyter, 1999.

External links

1923 films
1923 drama films
Silent American drama films
Films directed by Clarence G. Badger
American silent feature films
1920s English-language films
Metro Pictures films
1920s American films